Arutani (Orotani, Urutani, also known as Awake, Auake, Auaqué, Aoaqui, Oewaku, ethnonym Uruak) is a nearly extinct language spoken in Roraima, Brazil and in the Karum River area of Bolivar State, Venezuela. There are only around 6 speakers left.

Documentation
Arutani is one of the most poorly attested extant languages in South America, and may be a language isolate.

Existing data is limited to a 1911 word list by Koch-Grünberg (1928: 308-313), a 1940 word list by Armellada & Matallana (1942: 101-110), and a 100-item Swadesh list by Migliazza (1978). There is also an unpublished Swadesh list by Fèlix Cardona i Puig from the 1930s-1940s, as well as an unpublished 200-item Swadesh list by Walter Coppens from 1970.

Sociolinguistic situation
Traditionally, Arutani was spoken along the Paragua River and Uraricaá River in southern Venezuela and the northern tip of Roraima, Brazil.

Ethnic Arutani also speak Ninam (Shirián), since they now mostly live in Ninam villages. The remaining speakers of Arutani are found in the following Ninam villages.

Saúba (in Brazil): 1 speaker born in Venezuela who has family in Kavaimakén
Kosoiba (in the Upper Paragua River valley of Venezuela): 3 speakers
Kavaimakén (in the Upper Paragua River valley of Venezuela): 1 speaker
Colibri (in the Upper Paragua River valley of Venezuela): 1 speaker reported

According to Loukotka (1968), it was once spoken on the southern banks of Maracá Island in the Rio Branco area.

Language contact
Jolkesky (2016) notes that there are lexical similarities with the Máku, Sape, Warao, Tikuna-Yuri, and Tukano language families due to contact.

Lexical similarities with Tucanoan languages are mostly cultural loanwords. Arutani and Tucanoan languages also have completely different pronominal systems, and sound correspondences are irregular. Thus, similarities between them can be attributed to contact with Eastern Tucanoan.

Vocabulary
Loukotka (1968) lists the following basic vocabulary items for Auaké.

{| class="wikitable sortable"
! gloss !! Auaké
|-
| one || kiuaná
|-
| two || kiuañéke
|-
| three || uatitimitilíake
|-
| head || ki-kakoáti
|-
| eye || ki-gakoá
|-
| tooth || ki-aké
|-
| man || madkié
|-
| water || okoá
|-
| fire || ané
|-
| sun || nizyí
|-
| manioc || mokiá
|-
| jaguar || kaiyá
|-
| house || iméd
|}

References

External links
Alain Fabre, 2005. Diccionario etnolingüístico y guía bibliográfica de los pueblos indígenas sudamericanos: AWAKE

Arutani–Sape languages
Indigenous languages of South America
Languages of Brazil
Languages of Venezuela
Endangered language isolates
Language isolates of South America